The CNPS Inventory of Rare and Endangered Plants of California is a botanical online database providing information on rare, threatened, and endangered California native plants.  It is sponsored by the California Native Plant Society (CNPS).

Description
All plant taxa that the State of California or U.S. Fish and Wildlife Service list as being threatened species, endangered species, or rare species in California, are included in the lists. They are continually updated with additions, changes, and deletions.  In 2014 the CNPS Rare Plant Program began including Lichens of Conservation Concern. 

The Inventory is published every three to five years and is used by the State and Federal government for conservation planning.  It is used for scientific research, conservation and preservation, and enforcement of environmental laws in California.

History
CNPS originally developed the Inventory of Rare and Endangered Plants of California with the guidance of botanist and evolutionary biologist G. Ledyard Stebbins. 

The 1st Edition was printed in 1974. The last print version, the 6th Edition, was published in 2001. The 8th Edition, released in 2010 with ongoing updates, is the current database.  

The online database publication, which depends on volunteer contributions, is supported by the California Native Plant Society, University of California, Riverside Herbarium, and other institutions, organizations, and individuals.

See also

List of California native plants

References

External links
California Native Plant Society−CNPS: official Inventory of Rare and Endangered Plants of California website — with plant species searchengine.

Flora of California by conservation status
Online botany databases
Books about California
Florae (publication)
Environment of California